Grover S. Resinger (October 20, 1915 – January 11, 1986) was an American coach in Major League Baseball during the 1960s and 1970s. Previously, he was a minor league third baseman and manager. A native of St. Louis, Missouri, the 5'9" (175 cm), 160-pound (73 kg) Resinger batted and threw right-handed.

As a player, Resinger peaked at the Class A1 level (equivalent to Double-A today) with the Little Rock Travelers (1941 and 1946) of the Southern Association. He began his managerial career in 1947 as skipper (and third baseman) of the Pensacola Fliers of the Class B Southeastern League, but he was released as manager on June 14 with a 28–31 record. He remained in the league, but strictly as a third baseman, with the Meridian, Mississippi, Peps through 1949. During his 11-year minor league playing career, Resinger batted over .300 six times.

After spending the 1950s out of organized baseball, Resinger returned to the game in 1960 as a coach with the Houston Buffaloes of the Triple-A American Association. He then joined the St. Louis Cardinals organization in 1961 as a manager in their farm system. His 1962 Billings Mustangs won the Pioneer League championship. In 1963–64 he managed the Tulsa Oilers of the Double-A Texas League (winning the 1963 TL title) and in 1965 he was the pilot of the Jacksonville Suns of the Triple-A International League. His minor league managing record was 420 wins, 395 losses (.515).

At age 50, Resinger was promoted to his first big-league coaching assignment with the 1966 Atlanta Braves, although he resigned on August 10 upon the firing of manager Bobby Bragan. He returned to the majors as the third-base coach of the Chicago White Sox (1967–68) and Detroit Tigers (1969–70). In his final MLB assignment, he was the bench coach for Dick Williams with the California Angels in 1975–76.

Resinger was a colorful figure who promoted a fiery, hustling brand of play. In the waning days of his Detroit tenure, in September 1970, he bemoaned a listless performance on the field, saying: "You know, when country-club teams like the Red Sox and Tigers get together, they should play baseball one day, polo the next, golf the next, and sail boats the fourth day."

Grover Resinger died in St. Louis at age 70.

References

 Creamer, Robert, Sports Illustrated, September 21, 1970.
 Duxbury, John, ed., The Baseball Register. St. Louis: The Sporting News, 1968.

External links

 Retrosheet: Coach's page

1915 births
1986 deaths
Atlanta Braves coaches
Baseball players from St. Louis
Billings Mustangs managers
California Angels coaches
California Angels scouts
Charleroi Tigers players
Chattanooga Lookouts players
Chicago White Sox coaches
Detroit Tigers coaches
Gadsden Pilots players
Greensburg Trojans players
Jackson Generals (KITTY League) players
Little Rock Travelers players
Major League Baseball bench coaches
Major League Baseball third base coaches
Meridian Millers players
Meridian Peps players
Minor league baseball managers
New York Yankees scouts
Pensacola Fliers players
St. Louis Cardinals scouts
Selma Cloverleafs players
Shreveport Sports players
Vicksburg Billies players